Hussein Madi (born 1938) is a Lebanese painter, sculptor and printmaker. He studied painting, sculpture and printing in Beirut (at the Lebanese Academy of Fine Arts) and Rome (at the Academia di Belle Arti). He lived between these two cities between 1973 and 1986. In Rome, he did advanced research on Arabic cultural heritage and on Egypt. He went back to Lebanon in 1986 where he taught sculpture and engraving at the Institute of Fine Arts, Lebanese University and from 1958 to 1962, at the Lebanese Academy of Fine Arts. He has been exhibiting in Europe since 1965. His art has been showcased at the British Museum, the Venice Biennale and Tokyo's Ueno Museum.

Life and work
 

Born in 1938 in Chebaa, South Lebanon, Lebanon, Madi's body of works is often said to relate to modern European artists like Matisse and Picasso as well as the abstract designs of Islamic art. Madi outlines a silhouette of woman on the entire surface of the canvas with quick strokes of his large brush. His paintings are often based on interplays between straight and curved lines. The features of his characters are those of the Oriental man clearly showing his cultural heritage. In their attitudes, two expressions are found: a static one which shows permanence in the face of the transitory, and the deep Oriental faith in immortality and eternal rest, and also a facial expression of cruel irony, playing the part of the mask in the Greek tragedy or an expression of suffering through stiff posture, like the loud outburst of a horrible cry, the terrible roar of the Assyrian lioness dragging along her crushed rump. This rending roar personifies the cry of Humanity. The Italian critic Joseph Silvaggi writes about Madi: "His drawings are filled with symbols and rich with artistic conventions in simplified forms; they are an enchanted script, a résumé of figurative art, the art of modern man."

Awards
Madi has won several prizes: the Sursock Museum 5th Salon Prize for Painting (1965–66), the 8th Salon's Prize for Sculpture offered by the Italian Cultural Centre in 1968/69 and the First Prize for Engraving, Citta di Lecce, Italy (1974). He was President of the Association of Lebanese Artists (1982, 1992).

Publications
Unexpected Trove | The Unseen Works of Hussein Madi | Rome 1964-1970 (Dongola, 2019)
A Boundless Life (Antoine, 2012)
The Art of Madi (Saqi Books, 2005)
 Hussein Madi (Galleria d'Arte Cavour, 1972) (Italian)

External links
 Hussein Madi 
 ARTNET
  Hussein Madi at Aida Cherfan fine art

1938 births
Lebanese painters
Lebanese contemporary artists
Living people
Artists from Beirut